Ancenis-Saint-Géréon is a commune in the department of Loire-Atlantique.

It was established on 1 January 2019 from the amalgamation of the communes of Ancenis and Saint-Géréon.

Population

References

Communes of Loire-Atlantique
2019 establishments in France
Populated places established in 2019